The Kingpin (Wilson Grant Fisk) is a supervillain appearing in American comic books published by Marvel Comics. The character was created by Stan Lee and John Romita Sr., and first appeared in The Amazing Spider-Man #50 (cover-dated July 1967). The "Kingpin" name is a reference to the crime lord title in Mafia slang nomenclature.

One of the most feared, dangerous and powerful crime lords in the Marvel Universe, usually depicted as New York City's crime overlord, he was introduced as an adversary of Spider-Man, but later went on to be the archenemy of Daredevil, as well as a recurring foe of the Punisher and his adoptive daughter Echo. The Kingpin is the husband of Vanessa Fisk and later Typhoid Mary Fisk, and the father of Richard Fisk and Butch Pharris, the latter being his successor as Kingpin. His traditional attire consists of his signature white suit jacket and cane, though his appearance has been changed over the years. Across all iterations, the Kingpin is depicted with an extraordinarily heavyset appearance and a bald head. The character is not simply obese but also heavily-muscled (like a sumo wrestler) and a formidable hand-to-hand combatant. While this makes him a dangerous foe to face in person, even to Spider-Man, his size has been regularly mocked.

The character has been substantially adapted from the comics into various forms of media, including films, television series and video games, portrayed by John Rhys-Davies in the 1989 television film The Trial of the Incredible Hulk and by Michael Clarke Duncan in the 2003 feature film Daredevil and animated series Spider-Man: The New Animated Series. Vincent D'Onofrio portrays the character in the Marvel Cinematic Universe (MCU) franchise, having appeared thus far in the television series Daredevil (2015–2018) and the miniseries Hawkeye (2021), and scheduled to reprise the role in Echo (2023) and Daredevil: Born Again (2024), while Liev Schreiber voices the Kingpin in the 2018 animated film Spider-Man: Into the Spider-Verse. In 2009, the Kingpin was ranked as IGN's 10th Greatest Comic Book Villain of All Time.

Publication history
The Kingpin first appears in The Amazing Spider-Man #50 (July 1967), and was created by writer Stan Lee and artist John Romita Sr., who based his physical appearance on actors Sydney Greenstreet and Robert Middleton.

In his debut story arc in The Amazing Spider-Man #50–52, the Kingpin is portrayed purely as a crime lord, albeit one who tends to be unusually hands-on in his criminal dealings. In his subsequent appearances, also written by Lee, he becomes more of a typical supervillain, employing fantastic devices to further his criminal capers. In the early 1980s, the character evolved further. A series of appearances in Daredevil by writer/penciler Frank Miller depicted the Kingpin as a scheming, cold-blooded crime lord who consistently stayed beyond the reach of the law. This remained the character's dominant form for decades as the Kingpin became widely regarded as Daredevil's archenemy. He continues to be a recurring opponent of Spider-Man, Daredevil, Echo, and the Punisher.

Fictional character biography
Wilson Grant Fisk began his life as a poor child in New York City, bullied by his classmates due to his obesity. Fisk began training himself in physical combat, using his new-found strength to form a gang of his former tormentors that terrorized the surrounding neighborhoods. He was eventually discovered by mob boss Don Rigoletto, who hired him and his best friend as bodyguards, and Fisk worked his way up until he became Rigoletto's right-hand man. He then turned on his mentor, eliminating him and taking control of his men and business interests, before expanding his new empire until he had become one of the most powerful figures in New York's criminal underworld, earning the name "Kingpin".

While the Kingpin enjoyed a long tenure in his new position, he also garnered enemies in the form of the Maggia and the terrorist group Hydra. The two groups joined forces to attack Fisk's empire, causing him to flee to Japan after losing most of his assets. There, he started a legitimate spice exporting business and used the profits to return to New York, organizing his old followers and starting a war to destroy the Maggia. The resulting chaos allowed Fisk to easily step back in and gain back everything he had lost.

Fisk attempted to form a coalition of New York's crime families after hearing that the vigilante Spider-Man had disappeared and ordered the abduction of J. Jonah Jameson to silence his reporting on the Kingpin's crimes, but Spider-Man returned and foiled his plans, in what became Fisk's first confrontation with the web-slinger.

To avoid public scrutiny of his criminal activities, Fisk cultivated an image of himself as a legitimate businessman and a kind-hearted philanthropist who made donations to charities. He eventually met and then married a woman named Vanessa, with whom he had a son named Richard. Vanessa did not know that her future husband was a criminal when they married. When she finally learned who he really was, she threatened to leave him if he did not give up his life of crime. The Kingpin gave up his criminal empire, moving his family to Japan to protect them from his enemies. As time passed, however, he found himself unable to adjust to civilian life and became the Kingpin once more, this time with his wife's knowledge.

Richard did not find out that his father was a criminal until he attended college. After graduating, he told his parents that he intended to travel through Europe. Only months later, they received news that their son had died in a skiing accident. However, it turned out that Richard was still alive; he returned to New York, used a costume and mask to disguise himself as a mysterious new crime lord calling himself the "Schemer", and formed his own gang to destroy his father's empire. Fisk came back into conflict with Spider-Man as he worked to stop the Schemer.

At one point, he became the manager and director of a Las Vegas-based fragment of HYDRA despite their past opposition to his rule.

At his wife's behest, Fisk later permanently divested himself of his criminal empire. He unsuccessfully attempted to kill Spider-Man once more before stepping down as the Kingpin, swearing to never again return to crime.

1980s

To complete his reformation, the Kingpin agreed to turn over all of his records to the authorities so they could prosecute his former lieutenants. His wife Vanessa was subsequently kidnapped by the men he betrayed, who then put out a contract on his life. After witnessing Vanessa's apparent death, Fisk returned to a life of crime. He quickly regained control by taking advantage of his knowledge of the weaknesses of all of New York's criminal organizations, and made a promise to keep the East Coast stable to stop crime bosses from the Midwest from expanding into his territory. The Kingpin also gained the loyalty of infamous assassin Bullseye by promising him steady work. When Daredevil stole his records, the Kingpin did nothing to stop him, plotting to get his old allies arrested so he could select more compliant replacements. Daredevil realized this in time to stop himself from turning over the records, frustrating the Kingpin's plans. Kingpin maneuvered Daredevil into battling the Hand, hoping to get him killed. He secretly promoted corrupt mayoral candidate Randolph Cherryh, and hired the services of Elektra Natchios. Daredevil found Vanessa alive but amnesiac, and used her as leverage to force Kingpin to end his support for Cherryh. As retribution, he sent Elektra to kill Foggy Nelson (Daredevil's friend), but Elektra failed and was killed by Bullseye.

The Kingpin learned Daredevil's secret identity through information passed on from Karen Page, Daredevil's ex-girlfriend who was now a pornographic film actress addicted to drugs. The Kingpin used his influence to destroy Matt Murdock's civilian and professional life. Enamored with the results of his own scheme, he became increasingly obsessed with ruining Daredevil's legacy. This led to a series of events that included brutalizing respected crime reporter Ben Urich, having his employees James Wesley and Felix Manning assault Daredevil's confidant, dirty cop Nick Manolis, and sending the homicidal Nuke into Hell's Kitchen. Nuke's rampage killed dozens of people, and the Kingpin was implicated. Though he avoided prison, his reputation was shattered and the image of respectability he had carefully built was ruined.

Kingpin was sought out by the Black Cat (who was dating Spider-Man at the time), and became concerned that her lack of powers would make the woman a liability to him. He therefore arranged to have scientists on his payroll provide her with defensive "bad luck" powers that cause mishap to befall anyone who attempts to harm her in combat but also hurt and eventually kill anyone who stays close to her for too long. The Kingpin hoped that this would lead to Spider-Man's death, but Spider-Man and the Black Cat ultimately broke up instead. Shortly after, Fisk was attacked by Spider-Man. Fisk later had his scientists create the supervillains the Answer, and the Spot, to battle Spider-Man and the Black Cat so they would not interfere further with his operations.

1990s
Fisk later rehires Bullseye to look into the parties responsible for a major drug war in New York and survives an assassination attempt by Crossbones. In retaliation, he sends Bullseye to assassinate the Red Skull (Crossbones's employer). The attempt fails, and the Kingpin instead defeats the Red Skull (in a clone of Captain America's body) in personal combat.

Fisk subsequently purchases his own cable television station, partnering with a wealthy millionaire from Texas that the Kingpin thinks can be easily manipulated. However, the "millionaire" is actually a spy planted by HYDRA. Learning of this from Nick Fury, Daredevil spreads rumors among New York's criminal outfits that the Kingpin had become a stooge of HYDRA, weakening his credibility and influence. HYDRA operatives steal most of the Kingpin's fortune, deprive him of income by dismantling his businesses, and send a helicopter gunship to destroy his skyscraper offices. With his empire crumbling, the Kingpin is indicted on federal charges, and Daredevil tricks him into committing assault and battery when he tries to escape via Manhattan's Port Authority Bus Terminal. Bailed out of jail by a rival, Fisk finally snaps when he learns that his benefactor intends to use him as an "errand boy". He kills him, and becomes a fugitive.

The Kingpin regains his sanity and has a small role in Marvel vs. DC when he purchases the Daily Planet, firing Perry White and replacing him with J. Jonah Jameson. He also bullies workers, especially Lois Lane, who threatens to expose him as the Kingpin. Eventually, he is confronted by his angry staff but is defeated when Spider-Man (Ben Reilly) and Superboy (Kon-El) arrive before he can do any significant damage.  At the end of the crossover, the universes are restored and everyone is returned home.

Fisk returns to Japan and focuses on rebuilding his empire while fighting the X-Men and Shang-Chi, Kingpin became leader of Shang-Chi's father's organization, Si-Fan, introducing a clan of cyborg ninjas named Cyber-Ninjas. He returns to New York and resumes his criminal activities as Kingpin. Still under Kingpin's command, Si-Fan faces Shang-Chi and Elektra.

2000s
While in Japan, Fisk manipulates his adoptive daughter Maya Lopez (Echo) into thinking that Daredevil killed her biological father (although Fisk was actually responsible) to incite Daredevil's death. However, his plan backfires when Daredevil convinces Maya of the truth, and Lopez shoots the Kingpin in the eyes in retaliation, rendering him blind. Fisk eventually loses his criminal empire to Samuel Silke (one of his employees who works with Richard) in a bloody assassination bid, using the Kingpin's new status as a blind man to rally supporters. In the aftermath, Vanessa kills Richard and flees the country with Fisk's remaining wealth while the Kingpin recuperates in an unnamed East European country, broken and alone. He is given an eye transplant which restores his eyesight. He eventually confronts Silke and fatally crushes the man's head, almost manages to regain his empire through sheer will, but is defeated by Daredevil (who declares himself the new Kingpin). Fisk is imprisoned as a result.

He later hatches a scheme to be freed and regain his wealth by giving the FBI proof in the form of the nonexistent "Murdock Papers" that Murdock is Daredevil. Having made so many enemies in prison, Fisk is constantly under attack from the Hand, HYDRA, and any number of criminal organizations with which he had had dealings. The U.S. government is hard-pressed to get rid of this expensive, dangerous, legally clean master criminal, and Fisk succeeds in manipulating the FBI into gravely wounding Daredevil and providing them a sample of Daredevil's DNA. He tells Ben Urich to give the federal government the location of the Night Nurse, the only medic for injured superheroes, or go to jail.

Kingpin finally succeeds in getting Matt Murdock arrested, but the FBI betrays him at the last minute and arrests him as well, placing him in the same jail as Murdock in the hopes that the two will kill each other; instead, the two enemies team up to survive a prison riot directed at them. Finally, Murdock sacrifices the deal, refusing to let Bullseye (who was also incarcerated) leave the prison as the Kingpin had planned. The fight ends with the Kingpin shot point-blank in the knee by gunfire from Bullseye intended for Murdock, while Murdock escapes; a dying Vanessa is revealed to have manipulated events to attempt to have them both killed, while mourning her son's death.

Fisk appears in the 2006 Civil War: War Crimes one-shot issue, in which he offers information about Captain America's Resistance base to Iron Man, the leader of the pro-Registration forces in exchange for a reduced sentence. But as his status in prison is threatened for collaborating with Iron Man, he betrays Iron Man. He then puts out a hit on Spider-Man's loved ones after Iron Man convinced Peter Parker to publicly reveal himself as a means of demonstrating support for the Superhuman Registration Act. This results in May Parker being gravely wounded by a sniper's attempt to kill Spider-Man. After tracing the event back to Kingpin, Spider-Man confronts the Kingpin in prison and badly beats him in front of his fellow inmates. Spider-Man decides to let the Kingpin live with the humiliation of his defeat, news of which will quickly spread through the Underworld. Parker vows, however, to kill the Kingpin if May dies.

In the 2007 "One More Day" storyline, which ends with the undoing from history of Peter and Mary Jane Watson's marriage and Spider-Man's real identity public revelation, all memories on the part of the public that Spider-Man is Peter is removed, including the Kingpin's.

Murdock returns to the United States with a cleared name and completes Vanessa's last wish and takes on Fisk's case, getting all charges dropped in exchange for Fisk leaving the country, giving up his American citizenship and his agreement to end his vendetta with Daredevil. Although the charges were dropped due to the evidence being deemed inadmissible in court, Murdock delays the case enough so Fisk is unable to attend his wife's funeral. The mournful Fisk is later seen visiting his wife's grave, before temporarily returning to New York to resolve some loose ends.

In a 2007–2008 storyline in the series Runaways, Fisk meets with the Runaways, revealing he knew all about their parents since they ruled Los Angeles with efficiency and vision; he never tried to take their territory, nor did they invade his. He makes a deal with the Runaways to secure a mysterious object for him in exchange for protection from the government. He and his army of ninjas are defeated when the Runaways refuse to give it to him after stealing the object, discovering what Fisk wanted was a device invented by the Pride. It is later revealed that Fisk was hired by elderly woman Lillie McGurty who orchestrated the events so the Runaways can travel back to 1907 and ensure that the woman would come back to the present with them, which her past self declined.

During the 2008 "Dark Reign" storyline, the Kingpin forms an alliance with Lady Bullseye to destroy Daredevil. He orders Lady Bullseye to disguise herself as a member of the Hand and kill two corrupt cops and a judge, making it seems that Daredevil ordered this and prompting Norman Osborn as the leader of the law enforcement organization H.A.M.M.E.R. to send Bullseye in retaliation. Though Daredevil survives the fight with Bullseye, the Kingpin is undeterred and states that he has Daredevil "where he wants [his nemesis]". The Kingpin has also targeted Daredevil's friends to frame Osborn for their recent misfortunes to further his attempts on manipulating Daredevil's actions. He has Nelson disbarred as an attorney for standing up to a judge on his payroll for an unfair ruling of overturning a jury's verdict. He also causes the loss of Dakota North's private investigator license.

In the 2009 Daredevil arc "Return of the King", it is revealed that the Kingpin has spent the past year living a normal life in a small Spanish fishing village. There he meets and falls in love with Marta, a young mother of two. He finds himself trying to overcome his former life as a crime lord, only to later find Marta and the two kids murdered by Lady Bullseye and the Hand who then brutally attack him, stabbing him through the shoulders with two katanas. When he asks why, Lady Bullseye replies, "The reasons are far too numerous, but if you want a specific cause, ask Daredevil". In his revenge against the Hand, the Kingpin frees and recruits the Owl to help him. Fisk begins experiencing hallucinations of his dead wife who taunts him. It turns out that Fisk's actual plan is to take the leadership of the Hand, after killing Hiroshi, the ninja-lord who ordered the family's assassinations. However, he is thwarted by Daredevil who takes the lead for himself.

2010s
During the 2010 "Shadowland" storyline, the Kingpin approaches Iron Fist and Luke Cage, telling the two that they will need to take down Daredevil soon. The Kingpin and Lady Bullseye later perform a ritual that brings back Ghost Rider to attack the Hand. After Daredevil is dethroned from Shadowland, the Kingpin takes both Shadowland and the Hand under his rule, officially taking his place back as the crime lord of New York City.

During the 2010–2011 "Big Time" storyline, the Kingpin hires a new Hobgoblin to steal some experimental vibranium from Horizon Labs.

During the 2011 "Spider-Island" storyline, it is revealed that Fisk has gained spider-powers, as demonstrated by heightened reflexes and the ability to crawl on walls. Like all other New Yorkers, he lost those powers when the situation was resolved.

With Wakanda in a weakened economic position after the destruction of its vibranium stockpile, Kingpin attempts to purchase a controlling interest in the international Bank of Wakanda, with the goal of forcing the Bank to foreclose its current debts by selling its remaining land rights so that they can be exploited for more conventional mineral wealth. Fortunately, T'Challa becomes aware of this plan in his current role as defender of Hell's Kitchen (Matt Murdock needed time away after the events of Shadowland and T'Challa needed to re-learn his capabilities after the loss of his kingdom's vibranium), and begins a campaign of attacks against Fisk's new forces with the aid of Sam Wilson and Luke Cage. Fisk is so focused on these more public attacks that he misses when Shuri infiltrates and replaces Fisk's right-hand-woman, Miyu, giving her full access to Fisk's financial databases. Shuri plants a worm in the database that exposes most of Fisk's illegal financial transactions, with a final backdoor worm that could expose and ruin what little resources Fisk has left if he ever tries to come after Wakanda again (not wanting to completely take away his money as the heroes know from experience that Fisk will come back but this way he is more focused on protecting what he has left rather than plans for revenge).

Marvel NOW!
As part of the 2012 Marvel NOW! initiative, the Kingpin hears about how Otto Octavius as the Superior Spider-Man has been using brutal methods to take down the local crime families, which would leave a vacuum to fill. The Kingpin's Shadowland hideout is attacked by the Superior Spider-Man to which the Kingpin claims that the Superior Spider-Man is much different than the nemesis he had fought. While escaping, the Kingpin kills his doppelgänger Smedley Kornfeld (who was hired for events like this) to fool the Superior Spider-Man.

With his power over New York gone, Fisk set up shop in San Francisco, with the intention of rebuilding his empire there. But the vigilante Shroud acted first, taking control of the local gangs and kidnapped the Owl who also relocated to San Francisco. He transformed Owlsley into a super-computer capable of taking control of all wifi signals to locate his former girlfriend Julia Carpenter. During this time, Daredevil confirmed his secret identity, taking a positive approach to it this time and moved to San Francisco to practice law and continue his superhero career. Fisk began to make moves against both of his enemies, hiring the assassin Ikari to kidnap Foggy and Matt's new girlfriend, Kirsten McDuffie, and having his men look for Julia to have leverage against the Shroud. However, the Shroud and Daredevil came into conflict when he and Jubua Pride, the Owl's daughter, attempted to free Owlsley. The Shroud then released all private information about Daredevil's law practice's clients. Daredevil went to Fisk and offered him a deal, he would use his resources to fix his situation and assure Foggy and Kirsten are safe, and in exchange Matt Murdock would fake his death and get a new identity only Fisk would know, giving Kingpin back the power to destroy Daredevil, which he lost when he went public. However, Fisk went with his original plan instead and Ikari kidnapped Nelson and Kirsten. Meanwhile, the Shroud, Pride, and Daredevil crashed when they attempted to get Julia at an airport, allowing Kingpin's goons to take her. Fisk presented his hostages when Daredevil confronted him and had him fight Ikari to the death, with Fisk killing one of them if Daredevil wins. The fight took them to the streets, where the Shroud saved Daredevil and killed Ikari. Improvising, Daredevil took Ikari's costume and claimed to have killed the hero while the Shroud had the Owl bring to light all of Fisk's operations in exchange for his freedom. While Kingpin and Daredevil fought, the federals stormed his building. Daredevil beat down the Kingpin when he tried to flee and rescued the hostages, leaving him in bankruptcy.

During the 2015 "Secret Wars" storyline, the Kingpin hosts a viewing party for the incursion between Earth-616 and Earth-1610 where his guests include Absorbing Man, Bullseye, Norman Osborn, Sandman, and Scorpion. Festivities are interrupted by the arrival of Punisher who reveals that since he cannot take them with him, he has to put his large supply of bullets somewhere; the Punisher then kills them all, before they are resurrected in the reconstituted universe.

When the Purple Children acquired a machine designed by their father to enhance his powers, after Daredevil had saved them from a mob, they used the machine to erase the world's knowledge of Matt Murdock's identity as Daredevil, including the Kingpin's.

All-New, All-Different Marvel
As part of the 2015 "All-New, All-Different Marvel", Wilson Fisk represented Fisk Industries when he attended a meeting at the Universal Bank with Tiberius Stone of Alchemax, Sebastian Shaw of Shaw Industries, Darren Cross of Cross Technological Enterprises, Zeke Stane of Stane International, Shingen Harada of the Yashida Corporation, Frr'dox of Shi'ar Solutions Consolidated, and Wilhelmina Kensington of Kilgore Arms where they discussed with Dario Agger about his and Roxxon Energy Corporation's plans to exploit the Ten Realms of Asgard. Wilson Fisk also saw the arrival of Exterminatrix of the Midas Foundation, who knocked out Dario and declared herself a new member of their assembly.

During the 2016 "Civil War II" storyline, Kingpin returns from San Francisco, where he ends up in a fight with Bushwacker which ends in Bushwacker's apparent death. Afterward, he learns from a barista named Armand that his girlfriend Sonia had gone missing. Kingpin and Turk Barrett track her to a human smuggling business that Man Mountain Marko and Kingpin's former minion Janus Jardeesh are working for. Kingpin decides not to kill Janus when he learns that he is a recently emerged Inhuman whose abilities render him undetectable by Ulysses Cain's abilities. To test this ability, Kingpin has Janus kill a security guard that Janus knocked out upon discovering the smuggling business.

As part of the 2016 "Marvel NOW!" in a lead-up to the Dead No More: The Clone Conspiracy storyline, Jackal sends Rhino to Kingpin to get him on his side. He even had Rhino bring a version of Vanessa to persuade Kingpin to go along with the deal. Kingpin snaps the neck of his wife's clone, stating, "That's not my wife. That's an abomination". Rhino then fights Kingpin, even when Spider-Man shows up. After the resulting fight in which Rhino gets away, Jackal is not pleased that Kingpin declined the offer. Kingpin knows this is a set-up and has a better plan on using Spider-Man to get rid of Jackal. After Spider-Man and Spider-Woman of Earth-65 learn from the New U Technologies staff what had happened to Kaine and Anna Maria Marconi, Kingpin shows up and reveals he has been following the Jackal's trail ever since the encounter with his wife. He gives Spider-Man a folder containing the location of a meeting that Jackal will be at so Spider-Man can take down for revenge. Spider-Man is seen beating up most of the Kingpin's henchmen at a restaurant in Chinatown. Kingpin tells Spider-Man that he is ready to repay his debt and gives Spider-Man a flash drive that has the location of Norman Osborn.

During the 2017 "Secret Empire" storyline, Kingpin is among the people trapped in a Darkforce-enclosed Manhattan. When some armed robbers raid a church for medical supplies, Kingpin saves the people inside from the armed robbers. Kingpin tells the people to present that they should let people know that he saved them once the crisis is over. He later saves Doctor Strange, Spider-Woman, and Ben Urich from the Elder God Pluorgg by ramming it with his limousine and offers his help to the heroes. After crossing through a monster-filled subway, Kingpin takes the heroes to a witch to acquire weapons to retake the Sanctum Sanctorum, though Doctor Strange argues over the side effects of black magic. Kingpin is then possessed by a demon inside a mask and attacks the heroes until Ben, transformed into a mystical knight, stops him and they come to a truce. They later help Doctor Strange in defeating Baron Mordo, who had been put in charge of New York by HYDRA Supreme Captain America, and retake the Sanctum.

Mayor of New York City
After HYDRA's defeat, Wilson Fisk is able to use a subsequent election to put himself forward as a last-minute candidate to become the Mayor of New York City, avoiding his criminal past being drawn into the issue by simply ignoring questions about it, aided by the fact that he has never been legitimately charged with anything. With his primary policy being a bill to declare all vigilantes as criminals, and despite Daredevil's own recent efforts to create a precedent for superheroes testifying under their secret identities in Washington, he is able to have Daredevil arrested in an FBI sting operation, mocking his old nemesis with the knowledge that the people he protects chose Fisk to 'protect' them, prompting Daredevil to break a window and leap out of Fisk's office to begin his own efforts to bring down Fisk's empire. Matt Murdock then applied for the position of deputy mayor. Although Daredevil eventually attempts to set up a 'sting operation' where he and his fellow street-level heroes will capture Mayor Fisk meeting with various gang bosses, Mayor Fisk uses this plan against them and uses the opportunity to arrest all of Daredevil's allies, subsequently attempting to provoke Daredevil into attacking him. Although Mayor Fisk is able to arrest Daredevil as well, he is subsequently attacked and left in critical condition by the Hand, with various amendments made to New York's constitution by prior administrations putting Matt Murdock in control of the city, once he has escaped from captivity, thanks to the Hand attacking the police van where he was being held, Fisk in critical condition and nobody willing to challenge the legal situation. While Matt Murdock used his skills as Daredevil and the acting mayor to keep the city safe with the street-level superheroes fighting off the Hand, Fisk recovered. Murdock gave Fisk the position of mayor back to him where Fisk had to promise not to do anymore crusades against the vigilantes.

Mayor Wilson Fisk later adopts another daughter, named Princess Fisk, who he briefly sends to go to P.S. 20 Anna Silver, the same elementary school as Lunella "Moon Girl" Lafayette.

Mayor Wilson Fisk later appears as a member of the Power Elite. When Captain America is named as a suspect in the murder of Thunderbolt Ross, he ends up in an argument with Sharon Carter over Captain America's innocence.

Mayor Wilson Fisk later had an encounter with Kindred. This demon kills Fisk's associates using supernatural abilities and forces him to back off of Peter Parker after revealing that he is in possession of Vanessa Fisk's soul.

Operatives of Mayor Wilson Fisk free Electro (Francine Frye) so that she can be part of a female version of the Sinister Syndicate. When the Sinister Syndicate is formed, Mayor Fisk gives them their first mission to capture Boomerang who has stolen something from him. When the Sinister Syndicate catches Boomerang, Beetle contacts Mayor Fisk as she is given information on where the exchange should happen. As the Sinister Syndicate plans to adjourn for the night, they hear Mayor Fisk outside stating that they are harboring a criminal and are to surrender Boomerang to him or suffer the full might of New York City. The Syndicate notices the police, the SWAT Team, the Anti-Super Squad, and low-level bureaucrats. Spider-Man arrives as well and tries to get Mayor Fisk to have the authorities stand down only for Mayor Fisk to claim that Spider-Man fell prey to Boomerang's hypnotic boomerang. Electro claims that Spider-Man is buying them some time. After reading the paper in Boomerang's hand that belonged to Mayor Fisk, Beetle tells the Syndicate that they should let Boomerang go. While Beetle claimed that she betrayed them, she did it because she is a supervillain and states that she plans to have Mayor Fisk deputize them. The rest of the Syndicate is not up with this plan. The Syndicate then assists Spider-Man against Mayor Fisk's forces. Beetle has Spider-Man evacuate Boomerang while the Syndicate fights Mayor Fisk's forces while not killing them. The Syndicate is defeated and arrested by the police.

Mayor Wilson Fisk was reunited with his Miles Morales who has become Ultimatum. He was elated to see Ultimatum again while apologizing that he did not find what he was looking for on Earth-1610. Mayor Fisk and Miles begin their next plan together, while opposing a Spider-Man version of Morales from an alternate reality.

2020s
During the "Last Remains" arc, Norman Osborn meets up with Mayor Wilson Fisk and his men as they work on a plan to dispose of Kindred for what he did to them. Mayor Wilson Fisk is informed by Norman Osborn that Mary Jane Watson got through to Kindred. After Norman as Green Goblin crashed the confrontation and threw a Pumpkin Bomb near Mary Jane, he gave Mayor Fisk the signal to activate the trap which causes the tomb to be engulfed in darkness. It was revealed that they pulled this off by enlisting the help of Spot who powered Project Blank that was inspired by the Darkforce Dome that once surrounded Manhattan. With Kindred locked up in a special cell in Ravencroft, Norman Osborn stated to Spider-Man that he saved him from Mayor Wilson Fisk. At Ravencroft, Mayor Wilson Fisk talks to Kindred about their encounter in the Parisian catacombs. One of Mister Negative's lieutenants appears and informs him that the Inner Demons will help him get more than the Tablet of Life and Destiny.

Mister Negative later meets with Mayor Wilson Fisk and informs him that they will need the sister counterpart of the Tablet of Life and Destiny called the Tablet of Death and Entropy. As Mister Negative has the item, he states to Mayor Fisk that their desired function can only be used when both items are together. Mayor Fisk allows Mister Negative to control Chinatown and the Lower East Side. Outside of enlisting Mister Negative to steal the Tablet of Life and Destiny from Spider-Man and Boomerang, Mayor Fisk has also enlisted the services of the crime lords Black Mariah, a Crime Master, Diamondback, Hammerhead, Madame Masque, Owl, Silvermane, and Tombstone to obtain the Tablet of Life and Destiny where the first crime lord to obtain it will win Mayor Fisk's favor. Upon getting his hands on both tablets, Mayor Fisk uses its abilities to revive Richard Fisk as Mayor Fisk realized that Vanessa would not be pleased with her resurrection. He did this as an act of redemption for Vanessa and even himself.

During the "King in Black" storyline, one of Iron Man's plans to fight Knull's invasion is to persuade Mayor Wilson Fisk to enlist villains to help defend New York City and fight Knull's Symbiote army. This leads to Mayor Fisk paying a visit to the Bar with No Name where he asks who would like to earn some money. Kingpin puts together his incarnation of the Thunderbolts with Taskmaster, Mister Fear, Batroc the Leaper, Star, Rhino, Ampere, and Snakehead. When the villain Incendiary turned him down, Mayor Fisk shot him to serve as a warning to anyone that does not take his offer. The assignment he gives them is to take Star to Ravencroft to meet up with the one person who can help defeat Knull.

Second marriage and retirement
After Mike Murdock (Matt Murdock's magically created criminal twin brother) uses the Norn stone to cement himself into reality by changing the history of the world, he inadvertently makes it so that Mayor Fisk has an illegitimate son (alongside his legitimate son Richard) with Stella Pharris named Byron "Butch" Pharris.

Sometime later, before the "Devil's Reign" storyline, Fisk discovers physical evidence proving that he once knew Daredevil's true identity, noticing gaps in his own memory after the fact. Outraged, Mayor Fisk confronts Daredevil, who taunts him. Consequentially, Mayor Fisk appoints Butch as New York's new Kingpin, outlaws vigilantism in the city, and announces his intent to run for President of the United States. While backed by Senator Arthur Krane of the Friends of Humanity and other people, Fisk also starts the Thunderbolt units to help the NYPD crack down on superhuman vigilantism. He even visits Purple Man in prison and strangles him to submission, and later imprisons him (as he would later do with his children as well) to use him to control people, just like Doctor Doom had done a long time ago, to secure an electoral victory for himself. The few superheroes who were still free, including Captain America, Spider-Man (Ben Reilly), She-Hulk, Luke Cage and Daredevil, began trying to implement ways of defeating Fisk legally, including letting Cage run for mayor.

Blaming Daredevil for his failures, Fisk makes the Purple Man force the population of New York City into attacking the superheroes, while Fisk seeks out Daredevil, having regained his memory of Daredevil's identity after the Purple Man was able to suggest how it might have been done as he recognized the influence of his children in the memory wipe. Fisk ends up confronting Mike Murdock, mistakes him for Matt and murders him. In return, he and his now wife Typhoid Mary are attacked by Daredevil and Elektra. Daredevil nearly kills Fisk until Elektra intervenes. Fisk is arrested, but freed by Butch Pharris and several criminal financers, who want to install him as President of the United States next. Instead, Fisk kills them, leaves Butch to succeed him as the new Kingpin, and retires from crime with Mary by his side.

Skills, abilities, and equipment
While the Kingpin has no superhuman powers, he is incredibly strong and significantly more durable than the average human, possessing remarkable strength concealed by his extremely corpulent appearance. Most of his body mass is actually muscle that has been built to extraordinary size, much like a Super Heavyweight sumo wrestler, or some Olympic weightlifters and powerlifters but at greater strength levels. He has been shown to be strong enough to hurl large men across a room, and leave imprints in concrete walls after punching them. Defying his size, the Kingpin is a master of many forms of armed and unarmed combat, especially sumo wrestling. His signature move is the bear hug. His skill is such that he once fought Captain America to a standstill in hand-to-hand combat. His daily workout typically consists of simultaneously overcoming five or more trained martial artists with his bare hands, and he stores his valuables in a custom-built safe which has no lock, only a door which is so heavy that only the Kingpin himself is strong enough to open it.

He typically wears Kevlar armor under his clothing. Fisk sometimes carries an "obliterator cane", a walking stick that conceals a laser weapon that can vaporize a handgun or a person's head at close range. He typically wears an ornamental diamond stick-pin that conceals compressed sleeping gas that is effective if sprayed into a victim's face. Due to his wealth and intellectual acumen, Kingpin could use far more advanced defensive gadgets, but he prefers to use such things only as a last resort. As Fisk became less Spider-Man's enemy and more Daredevil's, he was portrayed more as a naturalistic mafioso than a comic book criminal mastermind, and depended less on science fiction–like weaponry.

Although state and federal authorities are aware of the Kingpin, they have never been able to prove his involvement in many crimes, and while Fisk has occasionally been incarcerated or put under investigation, his formidable legal resources and knowledge of the law have always protected him from any serious consequences. Members of the government have worked with him when necessary (even while describing him as "the devil"), such as when they needed his help to dispose of a Manhattan office building that the Beyonder turned into gold.

The Kingpin is intellectually formidable and is a master tactician and a highly skilled planner and organizer. He is self-educated to university graduate level in the field of political science, and is extremely skilled and knowledgeable in the organization and management of both illegal and legal business operations, allowing him to outsmart and outlast his enemies time and time again. The Kingpin's willpower is so great that he can resist even the Purple Man's mind control.

Reception
 In 2014, WhatCulture ranked Kingpin 1st in their "7 Unused Spider-Man Villains Who'd Be Great In The Marvel Cinematic Universe" list.
 In 2022, Screen Rant ranked Kingpin 4th in their "10 Most Powerful Silk Villains In Marvel Comics" list.
 In 2022, Screen Rant included Kingpin in their "10 Best Marvel Characters Who Made Their Debut In Spider-Man Comics" list.
 In 2022, CBR.com ranked Kingpin 8th in their "10 Most Violent Spider-Man Villains" list.

Other versions

Marvel 1602
In the Marvel 1602 universe, Wilson Fiske is a pirate and captain of HMS Vanessa, known as the King's Pin, who attacks the ship taking Peter Parquarh and Sir Norman Osborne back to England. However, although the attack leaves Osborne wounded, he and the crew are able to take the Vanessa when Peter deflects the ship's cannonballs by using his webbing to throw them back. Fiske is thrown into the sea to drown when Osborne confronts him directly, rejecting a desperate Fiske's "offer" to explain how he got his name.

"Age of Apocalypse"
In the "Age of Apocalypse" storyline, Wilson Fisk is known as Dirigible, a wealthy businessman who bought his way into the Marauders, a human terrorist group serving Apocalypse that makes up for their lack of mutant powers using technology which allows them to fly and emit explosive blasts. Dirigible is clearly the leader of the group, as he is seen giving orders to his three teammates. Alongside Red (Norman Osborn), the Owl, and Arcade, he attacks the human refugee camps of Wakanda. However, Dirigible is killed by Gwen Stacy.

Old Man Logan

In the 2008–2009 "Old Man Logan" storyline, there were different versions of the Kingpin that appear in a possible future timeline in which the United States has been carved up between the various super-villains as seen on Earth-807128 and Earth-21923:

 The first Kingpin is an unnamed African-American man who is described as a "man of the people" who fought his way to the top, gaining control of the western states and killing the domain's former master Magneto, who had become "too old" to fight back. He renamed Magneto's former territory Kingdom of the Kingpin. Hawkeye's daughter Ashley operated as "Spider-Bitch" and opposed Kingpin with her allies who operated as Daredevil and Punisher until Kingpin had the latter two captured and fed to carnivorous dinosaurs. Kingpin is eventually beheaded by Ashley after being freed by her father: striking her father over the head, Ashley reveals that she plans to take over Kingpin's territory herself, rather than free its people as he had assumed. Recognized as the new Kingpin by the surrounding guards, Ashley immediately attempts to have her father killed, only for him to be rescued by Logan; Ashley then sends her men after them.
 Ashley returns as the new Kingpin in Spider-Verse (2014–2015), Edge of Venomverse (2017), Spider-Geddon (2018), Old Man Hawkeye (2018), and Old Man Quill (2019). Her predecessor on Earth-21923 has the same history as the version on Earth-807128.

House of M
An alternate version of Wilson Fisk appears in the House of M storyline as a mobster who controls all crime in the human neighborhoods of Uptown New York. Kingpin cooperates with the Mutant authorities, acting as an informant on Luke Cage and his Avengers gang, in exchange for official protection of his territories.

Marvel Zombies
 The Kingpin appears in Marvel Zombies vs. The Army of Darkness #2 with his underlings, willing to work with the Punisher to try and save humanity from the zombie attack. The Punisher kills the group instead.
 He appears in Marvel Zombies 3 as a leader of the zombie horde, planning to invade Earth-616. He keeps his wife in hiding, satisfying his hunger (and those of other infected characters) by cloning uninfected humans as a source of food, Vanessa noting that his strength of will in controlling the hunger is the reason that he has become the leader of the remaining zombies even when the others have superpowers. Eventually, he eats her when his plan is defeated.
 An alternate version of Kingpin appears in Marvel Zombies Return, where he summons the Sinister Six to steal a sacred tablet from the college where Peter Parker attends. But when the zombified Spider-Man is transported to their world, he kills and devours five of the members. An infuriated Kingpin decides to confront Spider-Man, but is quickly dispatched and devoured by Spider-Man, leaving his men to run for their lives.

Punisher Max
Kingpin appears in a story arc in the MAX version of The Punisher, beginning with Punisher Max #1, with Bullseye as his main henchman. Like the mainstream version he is incredibly strong, able to squeeze someone's head until their eyes pop out. He is a highly formidable hand-to-hand combatant, cunning and utterly ruthless. This version of Fisk is also married to Vanessa and has a son, Richard, who is depicted as a young child. Following Richard's death, Fisk and Vanessa separate, with both taking Hand assassin Elektra Natchios as a lover and partner while plotting against the other.

Punisher Kills the Marvel Universe
In the one-shot issue Punisher Kills the Marvel Universe, the Punisher goes after the Kingpin after Microchip uses his hacking skills to destroy the Kingpin's empire. Kingpin informs the Punisher that he supported the latter's campaign to kill all of the superpowered beings, and has acquired an armory of weapons for the Punisher's use. As the Punisher attempts to shoot the Kingpin with an M16, the Kingpin grabs the rifle and destroys it with his bare hands. The Punisher responds by shooting two Desert Eagle pistols at the Kingpin, which only infuriates him. The Punisher kills the Kingpin by shooting him in the throat, and his body collapses on top of Castle, where he is found and arrested by NYPD officers. The Punisher's benefactor breaks him out of prison, whereupon Castle reveals he killed the Kingpin to acquire his high-tech weaponry, specifically a holographic scrambler, which Castle uses to disguise a helicopter as the Fantastic Four's Fantasti-car, so he can infiltrate Latveria to kill Doctor Doom.

MC2
In the alternate future depicted in the MC2 comics, Fisk has finally succeeded in killing Daredevil, although he made the mistake of betraying Kaine in the process. Kaine attempted to revive Daredevil with sorcery, but ended up bonding him with the demon Zarathos and Reilly Tyne (son of Ben Reilly, the Scarlet Spider), creating the superhero Darkdevil. When a gang war begins, Fisk is slain by a bomb while incarcerated in prison. While dying, he has a vision of his wife and son who show the unrepentant criminal his dark past. The two spirits tell him that he can only come to the "light" if he renounces his criminal past. It is left ambiguous as to what he decided.

Spider-Man: Reign
Fisk appears in a vegetative state in the first part of Spider-Man: Reign.

What If
 Fisk has appeared in different "What If" stories:
 In What If the Punisher had Killed Daredevil?, the Punisher hunts down the Kingpin, who has bribed the newly elected Mayor of New York City into working for him. Since the Punisher had used up the last of his ammo to kill Spider-Man (as his alter ego Peter Parker), the wounded Punisher attacks the Kingpin with a knife, only for the Kingpin to knock the knife out of his hand, and kill him by crushing the Punisher's throat with his bare hands. However, Castle had a back-up plan: he left a bomb outside the Kingpin's office, which goes off, killing the Kingpin and the Mayor.
 In What If Venom had Possessed the Punisher?, the Venom symbiote possessed Frank Castle, who used Venom's powers to murder criminals, which had the side effect of merging their personalities. The Kingpin hired Tombstone as an assassin, but the Punisher hunted him down and easily killed Tombstone with his bare hands. When the Punisher confronted the Kingpin, he found Daredevil and Typhoid Mary protecting him. Despite their best efforts to fight off the Punisher, the Venom symbiote used tendrils to envelop and strangle the Kingpin to death.
 In What If Karen Page Had Lived? where Bullseye did not kill Karen Page as part of Mysterio's final scheme, the fear of losing Karen drove Daredevil to attack the Kingpin for his role in the scheme, beating him to death.

Ultimate Marvel
 The Ultimate Marvel version of Kingpin is the head of New York City corporate crime, a ruthless murderer and notorious for bribing his way out of any prosecution. His henchmen include The Enforcers, and later Electro, and Elektra. He is rivaled by fellow crime lord Hammerhead, and briefly Mr. Big. In the first storyline in which he appears, Kingpin unmasks Spider-Man, and later taunts with the knowledge of his nemesis's secret identity many times. He also purchases the licensing rights of the Spider-Man movie franchise, essentially owning Spider-Man's likeness, during his battle with the Knights arc. He is ultimately killed by Earth-616's Mysterio, who blasts him out of a window of his building after the "Ultimatum" storyline.
 Fisk's grandfather appears in Ultimate Origins attempting to loot a house with Nick Fury and James Howlett (Wolverine) during World War II.

Marvel Noir
In the Marvel Noir universe, Wilson Fisk appears as a crime lord.

"Spider-Verse"
During the "Spider-Verse" storyline, Wilson Fisk assisted Mysterio and his assistant Ella in a plot to obtain the Spider-Man's blood.

Spider-Gwen

 In the series Spider-Gwen, which is set on the alternate Earth-65, Kingpin is seemingly served by his lawyer Matt Murdock. Kingpin and Matt Murdock send the mercenary Aleksei Sytsevich to kill George Stacy. This was done as revenge, for Fisk is currently imprisoned in solitary confinement, due to the efforts of Captain Stacy.
 Matt Murdock (nicknamed Murderdock) is later revealed to be the real Kingpin, with Wilson Fisk serving as his patsy.

Secret Wars
During the 2015 Secret Wars storyline, there are different versions of Kingpin that reside in the different Battleworld domains:

 In the Battleworld domain of Technopolis, Kingpin is a powerful crime lord who is allied with Arno Stark. Like everyone else in Technopolis, he wears armor to protect him from an airborne virus that has been plaguing Technopolis. He dispatched his men to capture Spyder-Man. Kingpin is critically injured by Grand Marshal James Rhodes' attack.
 In the Battleworld domain of the Valley of Doom, a Wild West version of Wilson Fisk is the corrupt Mayor of Timely.
 In the Battleworld domain of the Warzone where the 2006 Civil War storyline never officially ended, Fisk kills Doctor Octopus and grafts his arms onto himself, but the arms retaliate by electrocuting him, rendering him essentially brain dead. Fisk is later killed by Clint Barton.

Spider-Geddon
During the Spider-Geddon storyline, the Earth-83043 version of Wilson Fisk is the head of Kingliner and secretly orchestrated the airplane crash in the Savage Land that killed Richard and Mary Parker. Years later, Fisk and his ally Ka-Zar the Hunter are poaching dinosaurs when they set off a trap left for them by the Savage Spider-Man. While Fisk did recognize Savage Spider-Man as Peter Parker while confirming the suspicion that someone on the airplane survived, he did reveal his soldiers that were in hiding nearby. Just then, the giant spiders that raised Savage Spider-Man appeared where they attacked Fisk's soldiers and the airplane that Fisk is on.

Crossovers with DC Comics
 In the Batman & Spider-Man: New Age Dawning crossover, Kingpin is forced to partner with Ra's al Ghul in a plan that would destroy New York City, in exchange for a cure to Vanessa's cancer. As it turned out, Ra's gave Vanessa her cancer to force Kingpin to aid him, but the Kingpin actually formed an alliance with Batman and Spider-Man to save the city. Ra's attempted to get his revenge by denying Fisk the cure for Vanessa's cancer, but Talia al Ghul, Ra's' daughter, provided the cure herself, recognizing in Vanessa a kindred spirit, as both of them loved men that society regarded as monsters.
 In the Batman/Daredevil: King of New York crossover, Kingpin almost loses his entire criminal empire to the Scarecrow, who tries to dismantle it merely as a distraction so that he could spread his fear toxin throughout New York. In this book, Kingpin is shown to be a formidable physical match for Batman.
 The Amalgam Comics character the Big Question (Enigma Fisk) is a combination of the Riddler of DC Comics and the Kingpin. He appears in the Marvel/DC Comics crossover comic Assassins #1 (April 1996).

In other media

Television
 The Kingpin appeared in the 1967 Spider-Man series, voiced by Tom Harvey.
 The Kingpin appeared in the Spider-Woman episode "The Kingpin Strikes Again".
 The Kingpin appeared in the 1981 Spider-Man series, voiced by G. Stanley Jones.
 The Kingpin appeared in the Spider-Man and His Amazing Friends episode "Pawns of the Kingpin", voiced by Walker Edmiston.
 The Kingpin appears in the 1994 Spider-Man series, voiced by Roscoe Lee Browne. This version operates as a wealthy entrepreneur at public events and was born Wilson Moriarty. At a young age, Wilson saw his father robbing a bank and joined his gang. However, when his father abandoned him after a failed job and Wilson refused to name him in court, he was sentenced to prison, where he developed his skills before building his own criminal empire, renaming himself "Fisk", erasing his criminal record, establishing a hidden criminal headquarters in the Chrysler Building, and taking revenge on his elderly father. After becoming an established crime boss, the Kingpin comes into regular conflict with Spider-Man and makes several attempts to eliminate him, such as forming the Insidious Six and recruiting others to maintain his order like the Hobgoblin, the Spot, Alistair Smythe, and Herbert Landon.
 The Kingpin appears in the Spider-Man: The New Animated Series episode "Royal Scam", voiced by Michael Clarke Duncan, reprising his role from the 2003 Daredevil film. This version is African-American and has a red diamond-studded cane capable of shooting lasers.

 Wilson Fisk appears in television series set in the Marvel Cinematic Universe (MCU), portrayed by Vincent D'Onofrio as an adult and Cole Jensen as a child. Kingpin along with Spider-Woman will be shared by both the Marvel Cinematic Universe and Sony's Spider-Man Universe.
 First appearing in the Netflix series Daredevil, this version leads his crime family in taking over Hell's Kitchen while maintaining a presentable image to the public. However, unlike his traditional depictions, he initially lacks self-confidence, was emotionally unstable, and does not adopt the Kingpin moniker until much later. A large focus of his story in season one is his budding relationship with and eventual proposal to Vanessa Mariana while he and his right-hand man James Wesley have dealings with criminals, politicians, and corrupt police officers. Eventually, Fisk is legally detained after Matt Murdock helps the FBI arrest his associates. Fisk is then beaten in combat by Murdock as Daredevil before being arrested by Brett Mahoney and incarcerated at Ryker's Island. In season two, Fisk uses Frank Castle as a pawn to eliminate rival gangsters trying to usurp his power while using mob lawyer Benjamin Donovan as his new consigliere. When Murdock threatens Marianna during a prison visit, Fisk attacks him and receives damage similar to his fight with Daredevil, fueling his suspicions that Murdock and Daredevil may be one and the same. Fisk re-examines Murdock's files and plots to destroy Murdock's law firm as revenge. In season three, Fisk is released from prison after becoming a criminal informant for the FBI, scheming to regain his position in the criminal underworld under the guise of securing Marianna's return to the country with immunity. With the help of fixer Felix Manning, he manipulates his FBI protection detail, including the mentally unstable Dex Poindexter, and uses him to frame Daredevil as a criminal to the public and kill Poindexter's coworker Ray Nadeem. Additionally, Fisk confirms that Murdock is Daredevil during a murder attempt and arranges to have him killed by the FBI. However, Poindexter realizes Fisk manipulated him and his true intentions are revealed. Fisk battles Murdock and Poindexter, breaking the latter's back before Murdock defeats him. Fisk attempts to goad Murdock into finishing him off by threatening to reveal his identity, but Murdock refuses and counter-threatens to expose Marianna for her role in Nadeem's murder before leaving Fisk to be arrested.
 As of the Disney+ series Hawkeye, Fisk became involved with Eleanor Bishop, whose late husband Derek owed him money prior to the Battle of New York, and rebuilt his criminal empire over the course of the Blip. When Eleanor tries to break off their partnership however, Fisk attempts to have her killed, only to be foiled by her daughter Kate. He manages to escape being arrested by the police, but his surrogate niece Maya Lopez confronts Fisk at gunpoint after learning he orchestrated the murder of her father.
 D'Onofrio will reprise his role in the upcoming Disney+ series Echo (2023), and Daredevil: Born Again (2024).

Film
 Wilson Fisk appeared in The Trial of the Incredible Hulk, portrayed by John Rhys-Davies.
 Wilson Fisk / Kingpin appears in Daredevil, portrayed by Michael Clarke Duncan. When Duncan was cast, he weighed 290 pounds, and was asked to gain an additional 40 pounds for the role to fit the Kingpin's physique. This version is African American, originated from the Bronx, and is the head of New York City's criminal underworld disguised as a legitimate businessman.
 Wilson Fisk / The Kingpin appears in Spider-Man: Into the Spider-Verse, voiced by Liev Schreiber. This version is Alchemax's benefactor and has various supervillains under his employ.

Video games

Marvel's Spider-Man 
The Kingpin appears in Marvel's Spider-Man series, voiced by Travis Willingham. Similarly to his comics counterpart, this version is an exceptional combatant and criminal mastermind who posed as a respectable businessman, philanthropist, and owner of Fisk Industries to hide his true nature as the driving force behind most of New York's organized crime. Within the games' continuity, Spider-Man has existed for eight years, and it is implied that Wilson Fisk has been the Kingpin for even longer. During this time, Fisk has been Spider-Man's most prominent adversary, and managed to fend off all serious charges related to his crimes because the police were never able to gather enough incriminating evidence.
 At the beginning of Marvel's Spider-Man (2018), in which he serves as the first boss, the police finally obtain enough evidence needed to arrest Fisk and raid Fisk Tower with Spider-Man's help. Spider-Man neutralizes Fisk's private army as well as several officers on his payroll and defeats the Kingpin in combat, leading to his incarceration at the maximum security prison, the Raft. However, Fisk correctly predicts that his arrest will cause crime rates to skyrocket as new criminal figures such as Mister Negative and Hammerhead attempt to fill the power vacuum, with Spider-Man even admitting this later on. Despite being incarcerated, Fisk continues to maintain a number of fronts throughout the city, allowing him to continue financing his criminal empire, though Spider-Man helps the police find and dismantle them while also preventing Fisk's remaining men from breaking him out of custody.
 In the follow-up, Marvel's Spider-Man: Miles Morales (2020), a side-mission revolves around the new Spider-Man confronting Kingpin after discovering the latter recruited a gang of his former associates to sow chaos in Harlem and drive out local businesses so he can purchase their land and rebuild his empire once he gets out of prison. After Spider-Man thwarts an attack on a local block party, Fisk receives additional years to his sentence and is put under tighter surveillance by prison authorities.

Other games
 The Kingpin appears as the final boss in the NES version of The Punisher (1990).
 The Kingpin appears in Spider-Man: The Video Game.
 The Kingpin appears as the final boss in The Amazing Spider-Man vs. The Kingpin.
 The Kingpin appears as the final boss in The Punisher (1993).
 The Kingpin appears as the final boss in the Daredevil film tie-in game. 
 The Ultimate Marvel version of the Kingpin appears as a boss in Spider-Man: Battle for New York, voiced by Stephen Stanton.
 The Kingpin appears in The Punisher (2005), voiced by David Sobolov.
 The Kingpin appears as a boss in Spider-Man 3, voiced by Bob Joles. He appears in a sidequest, wherein he has the leaders of New York's warring gangs kidnapped and assumes control of their followers in the hopes of killing Spider-Man and taking control of all crime in the city. After the kidnapped leaders are freed, the Kingpin is confronted by a black-suited Spider-Man, who beats and humiliates him before throwing him out a window. Believing he killed the Kingpin, a horrified Spider-Man goes to check, only to find that the mobster disappeared.
 The Kingpin appears in Spider-Man: Web of Shadows, voiced by Gregg Berger. While Spider-Man initially works to dismantle his illegal operations and battles his technologically enhanced henchmen, after Manhattan is invaded by symbiotes, the Kingpin reluctantly allies himself with Spider-Man and S.H.I.E.L.D. to combat them and to ensure the city remembers him as its savior.
 The Kingpin appears in Chun-Li's ending for Marvel vs. Capcom 3: Fate of Two Worlds.
 The Kingpin appears in Marvel Heroes, voiced by Jim Cummings.
 The Kingpin appears in Lego Marvel Super Heroes, voiced by John DiMaggio.
 The Kingpin appears in Marvel: Avengers Alliance.
 The Kingpin appears in The Amazing Spider-Man 2, voiced by JB Blanc. This version is a wealthy businessman who finances Harry Osborn's Enhanced Crime Task Force to replace Spider-Man. Secretly however, he plans to take control of Oscorp once Harry dies of the same hereditary illness that killed his father, arranges for serial killer Cletus Kasady to escape custody so he can terrorize New York's citizens into supporting his plans to redevelop the city, and plots to take control of all organized crime in New York. Spider-Man discovers the Kingpin's plans, overpowers him at his private bunker, and attempts to download his files to expose him, only to be called away when Electro attacks the city. The Kingpin uses the opportunity to erase the incriminating evidence and joins the Chameleon, posing as Oscorp executive Donald Menken, to continue their plans.
 The Kingpin appears as a playable character in Marvel: Future Fight.
 The Kingpin appears as a playable character in Marvel: Contest of Champions.
 The Kingpin appears as a boss and a playable character in Lego Marvel Super Heroes 2.
 Two incarnations of the Kingpin ("Wilson Fisk" and "Spider-Verse") appear as separate playable characters in Marvel Puzzle Quest.
 The Kingpin appears in Marvel Future Revolution, voiced again by Travis Willingham.

Theater
Wilson Fisk makes a minor appearance in the Broadway musical Spider-Man: Turn Off the Dark.

Tabletop games
 Kingpin has been featured in Heroclix Collectible Miniatures Game.
 Kingpin has been announced for Marvel Crisis Protocol Miniatures Game.

Collected editions

See also
 Tobias Whale, a similar fictional crime lord and archenemy of Black Lightning in DC Comics.

References

External links

 Kingpin at Marvel.com
 Kingpin's Profile at Spiderfan.org

Characters created by John Romita Sr.
Characters created by Stan Lee
Comics characters introduced in 1967
Daredevil (Marvel Comics) characters
Fictional crime bosses
Fictional characters from New York City
Fictional hapkido practitioners
Fictional judoka
Fictional jujutsuka
Marvel Comics martial artists
Fictional mayors
Fictional murderers
Fictional sumo wrestlers
Hydra (comics) agents
Marvel Comics film characters
Marvel Comics male supervillains
Marvel Comics television characters
Spider-Man characters
Video game bosses
Villains in animated television series